Patrick Oswald Fletcher (June 18, 1916 – July 21, 1985) was a Canadian professional golfer.

In 1954, at the Point Grey Golf Club in Vancouver, he became the first Canadian since 1914 to win the Canadian Open. He is the last Canadian to win the tournament.

Fletcher moved to Montreal to become the head professional at the Royal Montreal Golf Club, and with his sons Ted and Allan, started the Fletcher sportswear and equipment company. He also won the 1952 Canadian PGA Championship.

Fletcher was inducted into Canada's Sports Hall of Fame in 1975 and into the Canadian Golf Hall of Fame in 1976.

Tournament wins
1947 Saskatchewan Open
1948 Saskatchewan Open
1951 Saskatchewan Open
1952 Canadian PGA Championship
1954 Canadian Open
1956 Quebec Spring Open
1957 Quebec Spring Open
1968 Canadian PGA Seniors

Team appearances
Canada Cup (representing Canada): 1955
Hopkins Trophy (representing Canada): 1952, 1953, 1954, 1955

References

External links
Pat Fletcher Golf Foundation

Canadian male golfers
Golfing people from Quebec
English emigrants to Canada
Sportspeople from Saskatchewan
People from Clacton-on-Sea
Anglophone Quebec people
1916 births
1985 deaths